John Cook or Cooke (baptised 18 September 1608 – 16 October 1660) was the first Solicitor General of the English Commonwealth and led the prosecution of Charles I. Following The Restoration, Cook was convicted of regicide and hanged, drawn and quartered on 16 October 1660. He is considered an international legal icon and progenitor of international criminal law for being the first lawyer to prosecute a head of state for crimes against his people.

Biography
John Cook was the son of Leicestershire farmers Isaac and Elizabeth Cook whose farm was just outside Burbage. He was baptised on 18 September 1608 in the All Saints church in Husbands Bosworth and educated at Wadham College, Oxford, and at Gray's Inn. Cook and his first wife Frances (died 1658) had a son (name unknown). With his second wife Mary Chawner, Cook had a daughter, Freelove, who was still a baby in 1660 when Cook was executed. Prior to his appointment as prosecutor, he had established a reputation as a radical lawyer and an Independent.

In a 2005 biography of Cook, Geoffrey Robertson argued that Cook was a highly original and progressive lawyer: while representing John Lilburne he established the right to silence and was the first to advocate many radical reforms in law, including the cab-rank rule of advocacy, the abolition of imprisonment for debt, the abolition of the use of courtroom Latin, the fusion of law and equity and restrictions on the use of the death penalty. Cook was among the first to argue that poverty was a cause of crime and to urge probation for those who stole to feed starving families; he originated the duty to act free of charge for those who could not afford it. Although he was not fundamentally anti-monarchist, he was forced to this stance when King Charles I would not recognise the legality of the court or answer the charges of tyranny against him. Robertson writes that Cook bravely accepted his fate at the Restoration when many others compromised with the new regime.

The idea of trying a reigning king had no precedent; previous monarchs had been deposed, but had never been brought to trial as monarchs. The High Court of Justice established by an act of the Rump Parliament consisted of 135 commissioners (all firm Parliamentarians); Cook accepted the brief to lead the prosecution.

The trial of King Charles I on charges of high treason and other high crimes began on 20 January 1649, but he refused to enter a plea, claiming that no court had jurisdiction over a monarch. When Cook began to read the indictment, King Charles I twice tried to stop him by ordering him to "Hold" and twice tapping him sharply on the shoulder with his cane. Cook ignored this so King Charles then rose to speak, but Cook resumed speaking, at which point King Charles struck Cook so forcefully on the shoulder that the ornate silver tip of the cane broke off and rolled onto the floor. The King nodded to Cook to pick it up, but Cook stood his ground and after a long pause, King Charles stooped to retrieve it himself. This is considered an important historical moment that was seen as symbolising the divine monarch bowing before human law.

Trial and execution

As a regicide, Cook was excluded after the Restoration of Charles II from the Indemnity and Oblivion Act which indemnified most opponents of the Monarchy for crimes they might have committed during the Civil War and Interregnum (1642–1660).

The memoirs of Edmund Ludlow give an account of Cook's trial and his public execution the next day.

Thus, John Cook was tried and found guilty of high treason for his part in the trial of King Charles I. He was hanged, drawn and quartered with the radical preacher Hugh Peters and another of the regicides on 16 October 1660. Shortly before his death, aged 52, Cook wrote to his wife Mary:

Descendants 
Cook's only known surviving child was Freelove Cook (named in Cooke's letter from his condemned cell). She was married at St Mary's Church, Newington, Surrey, on 13 June 1674, to John Gunthorpe, an apprentice goldsmith (1671) and the son of John Gunthorpe, citizen and innholder of London. John and Freelove Gunthorpe emigrated to Antigua, West Indies, before August 1677 (date on grant of Buck's Plantation to Gunthorpe); they were both dead before 9 September 1693, as indicated in the will of her mother, Mary (Chawner) Cook. John Cook's widow Mary, subsequently married John Shenton in 1669 at Barwell. Mary (Cook) Shenton died 1679. John and Freelove Gunthorpe had three sons Robert, John Junior and William (Born around 1682). John Gunthorpe Junior died in Antigua in 1740, leaving issue. William Gunthorpe had a son called William, also born in Antigua.

The journalist, historian and anti-Corn Law propagandist William Cooke Taylor (1800–1849) claimed descent from Cook.

References
Notes

Sources

External links
Biography of Cook British Civil Wars website
Audio from a talk on John Cooke by Geoffrey Robertson for Bristol Radical History Group

1608 births
1660 deaths
Executed regicides of Charles I
Alumni of Wadham College, Oxford
Members of Gray's Inn
People executed by Stuart England by hanging, drawing and quartering
Executed people from Leicestershire
People executed under the Stuarts for treason against England
Lay members of the Westminster Assembly
Solicitors General for England and Wales
People from Burbage, Leicestershire
English politicians convicted of crimes
Chief Justices of Munster